Billie Seward (born Rita Ann Seward; October 23, 1912 – March 20, 1982) was a 1930s motion picture actress from Philadelphia, Pennsylvania.

Film actress
Seward performed with Lou Holtz at The Beverly Wilshire Hotel Gold Room in December 1933.

She obtained a contract with Columbia Pictures following a three-month stay in Hollywood. Seward starred with Richard Cromwell in the 1934 Columbia production of Among the Missing. Wallace Ford joined Seward and Cromwell in Hot News, which was eventually titled Men of the Hour (1935).

She was in three western films written by Ford Beebe in 1935. The titles are Law Beyond the Range, The Revenge Rider, and Justice of the Range. Colonel Tim McCoy, Ward Bond, and Ed LeSaint were among her fellow actors. In One Crowded Night (1940) Seward plays Gladys. This RKO film is critiqued by Bosley Crowther who called it "a routine multi-plot melodrama, Grand Hotel reduced to a tourist camp."

Marriage
In 1934 Seward was linked romantically to actor Lyle Talbot. She married William Wilkerson, owner of the Trocadero (Los Angeles) and Ciro's, on September 30, 1935. Wilkerson was also the owner and publisher of The Hollywood Reporter. The couple separated in February 1937 but reconciled. Seward renewed a divorce suit against Wilkerson in March 1938, using her legal name Rita Ann Wilkerson.

Death
Seward died in Sherman Oaks, California, in 1982. She was survived by four brothers and two sisters. Her Funeral Mass was celebrated at St. Cyril of Jerusalem Roman Catholic Church in Encino, California, and she was buried in the San Fernando Mission Cemetery.

Partial filmography

School For Romance (1934, Short) - Mrs. Romansky
The 9th Guest (1934) - Office Worker (uncredited)
Once to Every Woman (1934) - No. 5
Voice In The Night (1934) - Barbara Robinson
Twentieth Century (1934) - Anita
The Hell Cat (1934) - Minor Role (uncredited)
Plumbing For Gold (1934, Short)
Whom the Gods Destroy (1934) - Jerry's Wife (uncredited)
Blind Date (1934) - Barbara Hartwell
 Among the Missing (1934) - Judy
Fugitive Lady (1934) - Miss Hyland
Law Beyond the Range (1935) - Gloria Alexander
The Revenge Rider (1935) - Myra Harmon
Men Of The Hour (1935) - Ann Jordan
Air Hawks (1935) - Mona Greenwood
Justice of the Range (1935) - Janet McLean
Riding Wild (1935) - Jane McCabe
Branded a Coward (1935) - Ethel Carson
Trails of The Wild (1935) - Jane Madison
Man from Guntown (1935) - Ruth McArthur
Charlie Chan at Treasure Island (1939) - Bessie Sibley
Reno (1939) - Mrs. Gordon (uncredited)
One Crowded Night (1940) - Gladys
Li'l Abner (1940) - Cousin Delightful
No Hands on the Clock (1941) - Rose Madden
Jane Eyre (1943) - Woman at Party (uncredited)
The Gang's All Here (1943) - Dancer (uncredited)
Take It or Leave It (1944) - Nurse (uncredited)
Something for the Boys (1944) - Minor Role (uncredited) (final film role)

References

External links

 
 
 

20th-century American actresses
American film actresses
Western (genre) film actresses
Actresses from Philadelphia
1982 deaths
1912 births